Jarir ibn Atiyah al-Khatfi Al-Tamimi was an Arab poet and satirist. He was born in the reign of Najd Arabia, and was a member of the tribe Kulaib, a part of the Banu Tamim. He was a native of al-Yamamah, but also spent time in Damascus at the court of the Umayyad caliphs.

Little is known of his early life, but he succeeded in winning the favor of Al-Hajjaj bin Yousef, the governor of Iraq. Already famous for his verse, he became more widely known by his feud with rival poets Farazdaq and Akhtal. Later he went to Damascus and visited the court of the caliph Abd al-Malik and that of his successor, Al-Walid I. From neither of these did he receive a warm welcome. He was, however, more successful with Umar II, and was the only poet received by the pious caliph.

His verse, like that of his contemporaries, is largely satire and eulogy.

Notes

Tabi‘un
7th-century Arabic poets
Poets from the Umayyad Caliphate
650 births
728 deaths
8th-century Arabic poets